Pseudagrion jedda is a species of damselfly in the family Coenagrionidae,
commonly known as a dusky riverdamsel. 
It is a large, dull and darkly coloured damselfly,  
found in northern Australia, where it inhabits streams and lagoons.

Gallery

See also
 List of Odonata species of Australia

References 

Coenagrionidae
Odonata of Australia
Insects of Australia
Taxa named by J.A.L. (Tony) Watson
Taxa named by Günther Theischinger
Insects described in 1991
Damselflies